The 2013–14 Fort Wayne Mastodons men's basketball team represented Indiana University – Purdue University Fort Wayne during the 2013–14 NCAA Division I men's basketball season. The Mastodons, led by third year head coach Tony Jasick, played their home games at the Gates Sports Center and were members of The Summit League. They finished the season 25–11, 10–4 in The Summit League play to finish in a tie for second place. They advanced to the championship game of The Summit League tournament where they lost to North Dakota State. They were invited to the CollegeInsider.com Tournament where they defeated Akron in the first round before losing in the second round to VMI.

At the end of the season, head coach Tony Jasick resigned to take the head coaching position at Jacksonville. Jasick was 52–47 in three seasons. IPFW promoted assistant coach Jon Coffman to replace Jasick.

Roster

Schedule

|-
!colspan=9 style="background:#4169E1; color:#FFFFFF;"|  Regular season

|-
!colspan=9 style="background:#4169E1; color:#FFFFFF;"| The Summit League tournament

|-
!colspan=9 style="background:#4169E1; color:#FFFFFF;"| CIT

References

Purdue Fort Wayne Mastodons men's basketball seasons
IPFW
IPFW
Mast
Mast